Mongol invasion of Thrace may refer to:

Mongol invasion of the Latin Empire (1242)
Mongol invasion of Byzantine Thrace (1263–64)